Joseph Blumenthal may refer to:
 Joseph Blumenthal (character), one of the main characters in the novel The Hope by Herman Wouk
 Joseph Blumenthal (printer) (1897–1990), American printer and publisher, typographer, and book historian
 Joseph Blumenthal (politician) (1834–1901), member of the New York State Assembly

See also
 Joseph von Blumenthal (1782–1850), Austrian violinist and violist